The City of Henley and Grange was a local government area in South Australia from 1915 to 1997, seated at the Adelaide seaside suburb of Henley Beach.

At the time of its establishment, it comprised four wards, each spanning the width of the local government area. From north to south they were: Grange, Kirkcaldy, Henley and South Henley.

History
On 2 December 1915, the seaside communities of Henley Beach and Grange in the District Council of Woodville and West Beach in the District Council of West Torrens seceded to form the Municipality of Henley and Grange.

On 11 June 1970, it was declared to be a city with the municipality being named "The City of Henley and Grange" and the corporation being named “The Corporation of the City of Henley and Grange".

On 1 January  1997, the City of Henley and Grange was amalgamated with the City of Hindmarsh Woodville to form the present-day City of Charles Sturt.

The old Henley Civic Centre on the corner of North Street and Seaview Road, Henley Beach, now houses the Henley Beach Library branch of the Charles Sturt Library Service.

Neighbouring local government
The following adjacent local government bodies co-existed with the Henley and Grange council:
 District Council of Woodville lay north, north east and east. Later it was known instead as the City of Woodville.
 District Council of West Torrens (established 1853) lay east, south east and south. In 1950, West Torrens attained municipality status and was known instead as the City of West Torrens.

Mayors
 
The following persons were elected to serve as mayor for the following terms:
James Hugh Sinclair (1915–1916)
G. S. Wright (1916–1918)
W. F. Harrison (1918–?)
Michael Kerrison (prior to 1924)
W. Barry
Ewart Wilfred Mitton  (in office in 1936 after four terms)
Hermann Gaetjens (1924–1925)
Cyril Chambers (1932–1934)
V. Harvey (1938)
G. T. Gurner (1950)

References

Henley and Grange, City of
Henley and Grange, City of
Henley and Grange, City of